Ali İhsan Karayiğit (1927 – 18 March 2013) was a Turkish international association football player. He is most known for his spell at Beşiktaş.

Career
Karayiğit started to play football in Salihli district of Manisa. He joined Beşiktaş in 1948. Karayiğit was a party of unbeaten Beşiktaş squad between 1949 and 1950, known as "Yenilmez Armada" in Turkey. He retired his playing career following his spell at Adalet S.K., in 1960.

Following his retirement from active football, he served Beşiktaş J.K. as youth section trainer and member of club's Executive Council. He also worked as a sports columnist.

Honours
 Beşiktaş J.K.
 Istanbul Football League: 1952, 1953–54
 Turkish Football Championship: 1951 
 Turkish Federation Cup: 1956–57, 1957–58

Individual
Beşiktaş J.K., Squads of Century (Golden Team)

References
Citations

Bibliography

External links
 Karayiğit at TFF
 Karayiğit at Beşiktaş J.K.

1927 births
2013 deaths
Sportspeople from Manisa
Turkish footballers
Association football defenders
Turkey international footballers
Turkey youth international footballers
Beşiktaş J.K. footballers